Racing Hearts is a 1923 American silent comedy drama film directed by Paul Powell and written by Byron Morgan and Will M. Ritchey. The film stars Agnes Ayres, Richard Dix, Theodore Roberts, Robert Cain, Warren Rogers, J. Farrell MacDonald, and Ed Brady. The film was released on July 15, 1923, by Paramount Pictures.

Plot
As described in a film magazine review, Virginia Kent believes that her father's automobile business needs publicity to save it from ruin. She tricks him into consenting to have a special car made for the race. She meets Robby Smith, the son of the owner of a rival business, and a love affair develops between the two. The selected driver of the car, Fred Claxton, has been bribed by the rival concern, and just before the race is set to begin tries to quit. Virginia takes his place and drives the car to victory with the assistance of Robby, who drives one of his father's cars.

Cast

Preservation
With no prints of Racing Hearts located in any film archives, it is a lost film.

References

External links

Progressive Silent Film List: Racing Hearts at silentera.com

1923 films
1920s English-language films
American auto racing films
1923 comedy-drama films
Lost American films
Paramount Pictures films
Films directed by Paul Powell (director)
American black-and-white films
American silent feature films
1923 lost films
Lost comedy-drama films
1920s American films
Silent American comedy-drama films